Jovan Rajić (September 21, 1726 – December 22, 1801) was a Serbian writer, historian, theologian, and pedagogue, considered one of the greatest Serbian academics of the 18th century. He was one of the most notable representatives of Serbian Baroque literature along with Zaharije Orfelin, Pavle Julinac, Vasilije III Petrović-Njegoš, Simeon Končarević, Simeon Piščević, and others (although he worked in the first half of 18th century, as Baroque trends in Serbian literature emerged in the late 17th century).

Rajić was the forerunner to modern Serbian historiography, and has been compared to the importance of Nikolay Karamzin to Russian historiography.

Notable works
Pesni različnina gospodskih prazniki (Vienna, 1790)
Kant o vospominaniju smrti, cantata
Boj zmaja s orlovi, (The Battle between Dragon and Eagles) epic poem
Istorija raznih slovenskih narodov, najpače Bolgar, Horvatov i Serbov (The History of Various Slavic Peoples, especially of Bulgars, Croats and Serbs), the first systematic work on the history of Croats and Serbs, in four volumes
Serbian Catechesis (Katihisis mali)
Uroš V (reworked drama by Emanuel Kozačinski, his teacher)

See also
 Arkadije Pejić
 Marko Jelisejić
 Antonije Hadžić
 Joakim Vujić
 Dositej Obradović
 Stefan von Novaković
 Emanuel Kozačinski
 Visarion Pavlović
 Simeon Končarević
 Zaharije Orfelin
 Vikentije Jovanović
 Gerasim Zelić

References

Further reading
 
 (Public domain)

External links
Life Overview (Serbian)
 Јован Рајић - отац српске историје у огледалу историјске штампе

1726 births
1801 deaths
18th-century Serbian historians
Christian writers
Eastern Orthodox Christians from Serbia
Eastern Orthodox theologians
Habsburg Serbs
Members of the Serbian Orthodox Church
National University of Kyiv-Mohyla Academy alumni
People from Sremski Karlovci
Serbian geographers
Serbian male poets
Serbian theologians
18th-century travelers